
Year 487 BC was a year of the pre-Julian Roman calendar. At the time, it was known as the Year of the Consulship of Sicinius and Aquillius (or, less frequently, year 267 Ab urbe condita). The denomination 487 BC for this year has been used since the early medieval period, when the Anno Domini calendar era became the prevalent method in Europe for naming years.

Events

By place

Greece 
 The island of Aegina and the city of Athens go to war. The island has earned the enmity of Athens by earlier submitting to the Persians. The Spartan King, Leotychidas, tries unsuccessfully to arrange a truce in the war.
 The Athenian Archonship becomes elective by lot from all the citizens, an important milestone in the move towards radical Athenian democracy. There are nine archons and a secretary. Three of the archons have special functions: the basileus, or sovereign; the polemarch (originally a military commander); and the archon eponymous (chief magistrate), who gave his name to the year.
 First known use of ostracism, an instrument created in 508 by Cleisthenes which enabled the electorate to banish for ten years any citizen deemed to be a threat to democracy. It was intended, therefore, as a safeguard against tyranny. An ostracism could be held annually providing a quorum of 6,000 was achieved but, apparently, the Assembly declined to invoke it until 487 when there was a popular reaction against Hipparchos the Pisistradid who had been the peace party archon in 496. He was the first of several citizens to be ostracised through the fifth century.

Rome
 Wars are fought between Rome and each of the Volsci and the Hernici. Rome prevails in both disputes.

Kush
 Siaspiqa becomes ruler of the Kushite kingdom of Meroe, likely succeeding Amaniastabarqa.

Births 
 Gorgias, Greek philosopher (approximate date) (d. c. 376 BC)

Deaths

References

Sources